This is a list of the first women lawyer(s) and judge(s) in Georgia. It includes the year in which the women were admitted to practice law (in parentheses). Also included are women who achieved other distinctions such becoming the first in their state to graduate from law school or become a political figure.

Firsts in Georgia's history

Law School  

 First female law graduate: Minnie Anderson Hale in 1911

Lawyers 

First females: Minnie Anderson Hale, Betty Reynolds Cobb and Mary C. Johnson (1916)  
 First female to practice before the Georgia Court of Appeals and the Supreme Court of Georgia: Viola Ross Napier (1920) in 1922  
First African American female: Rachel E. Pruden-Herndon (1942) 
First Asian American (female; Filipino descent): Ruby Carpio Bell (1964)

State judges 

First female: Annie Ogburn Anderson in 1922 
First African American female: Edith Grant Ingram in 1969  
First female (court of record): Dorothy Robinson in 1972 
First female elected (without prior judicial service): Rufe McCombs Maulsby in 1975  
First female elected (superior court): Phyllis A. Kravitch (1943) in 1976 
First female (Georgia Court of Appeals): Dorothy Beasley (1969) in 1984  
First female (temporary judge; Georgia Supreme Court): Dorothy Robinson in 1985 
 First African American female (superior court): Leah Ward Sears (1980) in 1988  
First African American female (Chief Presiding Judge of a Georgia court): Glenda Hatchett (1977) in 1990  
First (African American) female (Georgia Supreme Court; Chief Justice):  Leah Ward Sears (1980) in 1992 and 2005 respectively 
First female (Georgia Court of Appeals; appointed without judicial experience): Anne Elizabeth Barnes in 1999  
 First African American female (Georgia Court of Appeals; Chief Judge): M. Yvette Miller started judicial service in 1999  
First Korean American female: Chong J. Kim in 2000  
First Latino American female: Carolina Colin-Antonini in 2001 
First Asian American (female) (Georgia Court of Appeals): Carla Wong McMillian in 2013  
First Filipino American (female): Rizza O’Connor in 2013  
First South Asian (female): Jaslovelin Jessy Lall in 2015  
First Asian American female (temporary and permanent judge; Georgia Supreme Court): Carla Wong McMillian in 2015 and 2020 
First Jamaican American (female): Jewel Scott in 2020
First Asian American female (juvenile court): Nahn-Ai Simms in 2020
First Asian American female (Korean descent) (probate court): Sandra Pak in 2020  
First African American female (appointed by a Republican governor; Georgia Court of Appeals): Verda Colvin in 2020  
First Asian American female (County Recorder’s Court): Mihae Park in 2021  
First Latino American female (trial court): Ana Maria Martinez in 2022

Federal judges 

 First female (United States District Court for the Northern District of Georgia; Chief Judge): Orinda Dale Evans (1968) in 1979 and 1999 respectively  
 First African American female (Article III judge): Leslie Abrams Gardner in 2014
 First female (United States Court of Appeals for the Fifth Circuit; prior to the state's removal): Phyllis A. Kravitch (1943) in 1979  
 First female (United States Court of Appeals for the Eleventh Circuit): Frank M. Hull (1973) in 1997

Assistant Attorney General of Georgia 

 First female: Rubye Jackson

United States Attorney 

 First female (Northern District of Georgia): Sally Yates in 2010

District Attorney 

 First female: Cheryl Fisher Custer in 1981 
 First Latino American (female) elected: Deborah Gonzalez in 2020

State Bar of Georgia 

 First female president (Young Lawyers Division): Donna Barwick from 1988-1989 
First female president (State Bar of Georgia): Linda Klein in 1997
 First (African American) female (State Bar of Georgia): Patrise M. Perkins-Hooker in 2014

Firsts in local history

 Heather H. Lanier: First female appointed as a Judge of the South Georgia Circuit Superior Court [Baker, Calhoun, Decatur, Grady and Mitchell Counties, Georgia]
 Hulane E. George: First female appointed as a Judge of the Ocmulgee Judicial Circuit (2006) [Baldwin, Greene, Hancock, Jasper, Jones, Morgan, Putnam and Wilkinson Counties, Georgia]
 Rosemary Greene: First female District Attorney for the Cherokee Judicial Circuit, Georgia [Bartow and Gordon Counties, Georgia]
 Denise Fachini: First female appointed as a Judge of the Cordele Judicial Circuit [Ben Hill, Crisp, Dooly, and Wilcox Counties, Georgia]
 Eleonore Raoul: First female to graduate from Emory University’s School of Law in Atlanta, Georgia (1920) [DeKalb and Fulton Counties, Georgia]
 Sarah Irene Brown, Lucine Milan Dalton, Ann Kimsey and Mrs. Holbrook: First females to graduate from John Marshall Law School (1938) [DeKalb and Fulton Counties, Georgia]
 Mary Welcome (1968): First African American female Court Solicitor in Atlanta, Georgia ([DeKalb and Fulton Counties, Georgia; 1975)
 Sharon Mackenzie and Diana McDonald: First females to graduate from the Georgia State University College of Law (1984) [DeKalb and Fulton Counties, Georgia]
 Catharina Haynes (1986): First female graduate from Emory University’s School of Law in Atlanta, Georgia to be appointed to the US Court of Appeals for the Fifth Circuit [DeKalb and Fulton Counties, Georgia]
 Chong Kim: First Asian American female to serve as a municipal court judge for Doraville, Georgia (2020)  [DeKalb and Fulton Counties, Georgia]
 Vanessa Kosky: First Latino American female to serve as a municipal court judge for Doraville, Georgia (2020) [DeKalb and Fulton Counties, Georgia]
 Sherry Boston: First (African American) female to serve as a municipal court judge for Dunwoody, Georgia [DeKalb and Fulton Counties, Georgia]
 Layla Zon: First female District Attorney and Judge of the Superior Court in the Alcovy Circuit Court, Georgia (2010) [Newton and Walton Counties, Georgia]
 Edith Elizabeth House: First female graduate from the University of Georgia School of Law (1925) [Athens-Clark County, Georgia]
 Eva L. Sloan: First female lawyer in Milledgeville, Georgia [Baldwin County, Georgia]
 Alene Hardin (c. 1918): First female lawyer in Macon, Georgia [Bibb County, Georgia]
 Faye Sanders Martin (1956): First woman to practice law in Bulloch County, Georgia. She would later become a judge.
 Sarah Estelle ("Stella") Akin (1917): First female lawyer in Savannah, Georgia [Chatham County, Georgia]
 Mary V. Clark Creech (1939): First female lawyer in Savannah, Georgia to have a courtroom practice [Chatham County, Georgia]
 Shalena Jones: First African American female elected as the District Attorney of Chatham County, Georgia (2020)
 Shannon Wallace: First female to serve as the District Attorney for Cherokee County, Georgia
 Leah Ward Sears (1980): First African American female (and African American in general) judge in Clayton County, Georgia
 Jewel Scott: First Jamaican American (female) appointed as a Judge of the Clayton County Superior Court (2020). She was also the first (Caribbean-American) female District Attorney for Clayton County.
 Jenny Nguyen: First Asian American female judge in Clayton County, Georgia
 Helen Huff (1939): First female lawyer in Cobb County, Georgia
 Dorothy Robinson: First female to serve as a Judge of the Cobb County Superior Court, Georgia (1972)
 Adele Grubbs (1969): First female to serve as the Assistant District Attorney for Cobb County, Georgia (1977)
 Joyette Holmes: First female (and African American) to serve as the District Attorney for Cobb County, Georgia (2019)
 Cathy Cox (1984): First female lawyer in Bainbridge, Georgia [Decatur County, Georgia]
 Linda W. Hunter (1981): First African American female judge of the DeKalb Superior Court and Chief Judge and Administrative Judge of the DeKalb Superior Court [DeKalb County, Georgia]
 Carol W. Hunstein: First female elected as a Judge of the Superior Court bench in DeKalb County, Georgia (1984)
 Gwendolyn Keyes Fleming: First African American female elected as the District Attorney of the Stone Mountain Circuit (2004) [DeKalb County, Georgia]
 Christina Peterson: First African American (female) probate judge in Douglas County, Georgia
 Angela DeLorme (1984): First female lawyer in Fannin County, Georgia
 Kathy Valencia: First female appointed as a Judge of the Fayette County Magistrate Court, Georgia (2010)
 Jane Kent Plaginos Mitchell (1971): First female lawyer in Forsyth County, Georgia
 Dorothy Beasley (1969): First female judge in Fulton County, Georgia (1977)
 Glenda Hatchett (1977): First African American female to become the Chief Presiding Judge of the Fulton County, Georgia Juvenile Court (1990)
 Tiffany Carter-Sellers: First (African American) female to serve as the municipal court judge for South Fulton, Georgia (2017)
 Fani Willis: First (African American) female to serve as the District Attorney for Fulton County, Georgia (2020)
 Y. Soo Jo: First Asian American (female) to serve as the County Attorney for Fulton County, Georgia (2021)
 LaVonda Reed: First African American (female) to serve as the Dean of the Georgia State University College of Law (2021)
 Lanelle Rimes Eaves: First female lawyer in Brunswick, Georgia [Glynn County, Georgia]
 Ruth Rocker McMullin: First Vietnamese American female judge in Gwinnett County, Georgia
 Ronda Colvin-Leary: First African American female elected as a Judge of the Gwinnett County State Court (2018) [Gwinnett County, Georgia]
 Tiffany Porter: First African American (female) to serve as the Associate Judge of Duluth, Georgia (2019) [Gwinnett County, Georgia]
 Tadia Whitner: First African American (female) appointed as a Judge of the Gwinnett County Superior Court (2019)
 Angela D. Duncan: First openly LGBT female to serve as a Judge of the Gwinnett County Superior Court (2020)
 Patsy Austin-Gatson: First African American female elected as the District Attorney of Gwinnett County, Georgia (2020)
 Sandra Pak: First Korean American female judge in Gwinnett County, Georgia (2020)
 Mihae Park: First Asian American female to serve as a Judge of the Gwinnett County Recorder’s Court (2021)
 Pandora Palmer (1994): First female to serve as a Judge of the State Court of Henry County, Georgia (2019)
 Holly Veal: First African American (female) to serve as a Judge in the Flint Judicial Circuit (Superior Court of Henry County; 2018)
 Danielle P. Roberts: First African-American (female) to serve as a Judge of the State Court of Henry County, Georgia (2020)
 Aretha Miller: First female lawyer in Laurens County, Georgia
 Annie Anderson: First female judge in Laurens County, Georgia (1922)
 Kathryn Pierce: First female to graduate from Mercer University’s Walter F. George School of Law in Macon-Bibb County, Georgia (1919)
 Verda Colvin: First African American female to serve as a Judge of the Macon Judicial Circuit
 Anita Reynolds Howard: First African American (female) to serve as the District Attorney in the Macon Judicial District (2021)
 Nancy Calhoun (1985): First female lawyer in Murray County, Georgia
 Maureen Wood: First African American (female) to serve as a Judge of the Rockland Juvenile Court (2016)

See also  
 List of first women lawyers and judges in the United States
 Timeline of women lawyers in the United States
 Women in law

Other topics of interest 

 List of first minority male lawyers and judges in the United States
 List of first minority male lawyers and judges in Georgia

References 

Lawyers, Georgia, first
Georgia, first
Georgia, first
Women, Georgia, first
Women, Georgia, first
Women in Georgia (U.S. state)
Georgia (U.S. state) lawyers
Lists of people from Georgia (U.S. state)